Facundo Díaz Acosta was the defending champion but lost in the final to Juan Manuel Cerúndolo.

Cerúndolo won the title after defeating Díaz Acosta 6–3, 3–6, 6–4 in the final.

Seeds

Draw

Finals

Top half

Bottom half

References

External links
Main draw
Qualifying draw

Challenger Coquimbo II - 1
2022 Singles 2